Margit Warburg (born 15 February 1952) is a Danish sociologist of religion. Since 2004, she has been professor of Sociology of Religion in the Department of Cross-Cultural and Regional Studies at the University of Copenhagen.  She was an associate professor at the same university from 1979 to 2004.

Academic career
Margit Warburg received the University of Copenhagen's 1976 gold medal for answering an economic problem in Christian studies. She received her Magister (PhD) degree in sociology of religion from the University of Copenhagen in 1979, and her Dr.Phil. (DLitt) degree in 2007 with a monographic dissertation on the Baháʼí Faith titled Citizens of the World: A History and Sociology of the Baháʼís from a Globalisation Perspective.

Following her Magister's degree, Warburg was employed at the University of Copenhagen as an associate professor. She became professor of Sociology of Religion in the university's Department of Cross-Cultural and Regional Studies in 2004. Her inaugural lecture was entitled Sociology of Religion and the globalization. She helped create the University of Copenhagen's inter-faculty research project "Religion in the 21st Century" (2003–2007), co-chaired its steering group, and has headed the Department of Religious History.

She has authored, co-authored, and edited books and articles dealing with the study and sociology of religion. With Eileen Barker, she co-edited New Religions and New Religiosity in 1998 (Aarhus University Press). She also did extensive archival work and fieldwork on the Baháʼí religion in Denmark, the U.S., Israel, and Iran. This led in 2003 to publication of Baháʼí (Signature Books).

One focus of Warburg's research is the effect on Danish society and identity of increasing religious diversity. She has written about civil religion, and presented about mixed marriages as a part of the "Religion Report" show on Danmarks Radio Program 1.

Warburg is a member of the Advisory Committee on Religious Denominations which reports to Denmark's Ministry of Ecclesiastical Affairs, and she has co-chaired the Research Network on New Religions (RENNER).

Selected bibliography
 
 
 
 
 
 
 
 
 
 
 Barker, Eileen; Warburg, Margit (editors). 1998. New Religions and New Religiosity. Aarhus, Denmark: Aarhus University Press.

References

External links
 Margit Warburg / University of Copenhagen

Danish sociologists
Sociologists of religion
Researchers of new religious movements and cults
1952 births
Living people